Jamyang Tsering Namgyal (born 4 August 1985) is an Indian politician and Member of Parliament from Ladakh, India's largest parliamentary seat geographically. Namgyal was elected, on 9 November 2018, to be the youngest and 8th Chief Executive Councillor (CEC) of Ladakh Autonomous Hill Development Council, Leh. He belongs to the Bharatiya Janata Party (BJP).

Early life
Jamyang Tsering Namgyal, popularly known to people as JTN, was born in Matho village in the Leh District of Jammu and Kashmir, India (present day in Ladakh, India) on 4th August, 1985 to Stanzin Dorjey and Ishey Putit. He passed his 12th examinations from Central Institute of Buddhist Studies, Leh. Later he completed his graduation from University of Jammu. He practices Buddhism.

Political career
Prior to joining politics, he served All Ladakh Student Association, Jammu, in various capacities and as President from 2011 to 2012. After joining politics as member of BJP, Leh, he served as Private Secretary to the Member of Parliament from Ladakh Thupstan Chhewang. He contested the election of Ladakh Autonomous Hill Development Council, Leh in 2015 from Martselang Constituency. He won with record margin to be elected as Councillor in Ladakh Autonomous Hill Development Council, Leh. Later after the resignation of Dorjay Motup from the post of Chief Executive Councillor, Jamyang Tsering Namgyal was elected as 8th Chief Executive Councillor to the Ladakh Autonomous Hill Development Council, Leh.

BJP had fielded JTN from Ladakh parliamentary constituency on 29 March 2019 in the 2019 Elections to the Lok Sabha or House of the People of Indian Parliament, the voting for which took place on 6 May 2019 and the counting was on 23 May 2019. He was elected into the 17th Lok Sabha, representing Ladakh constituency. He is one of the 3 members from BJP in the Union Territories of Jammu-Kashmir and Ladakh for the 17th Lok Sabha.

MP Tsering gained prominence in media and social media after his speech in the lower house of the Indian parliament in support of the bill ensuring re-designation of Ladakh as a Union Territory of India, and the revocation of special status lent to Jammu and Kashmir by a Presidential order. For this, he was also praised by the Prime Minister of India, Narendra Modi.

Published works
 Authored and published a poetry book "༄། །སྙན་ངག་གི་ལེགས་སྐྱེས།། A Gift of Poetry" in 2013
 Authored an article "Divisional Status for Ladakh- Its Implication" published on 11 March 2014 by Daily Excelsior
 Authored article "Inclusion of Bhoti Language in the Eight Schedule of Indian Constitution" published by Himalayan Cultural Heritage Foundation as its main story of the year 2012

References

External links 

1985 births
Living people
Indian politicians
People from Leh district
Bharatiya Janata Party politicians from Ladakh
Lok Sabha members from Jammu and Kashmir
India MPs 2019–present
Indian Buddhists
Ladakh politicians
University of Jammu alumni